604th Squadron may refer to:

 No. 604 Squadron RAF
 604th Air Support Operations Squadron, United States Air Force
 604th Special Operations Squadron, United States Air Force